The Compass Rose is a 1982 collection of short stories by American writer Ursula K. Le Guin, and illustrated by Anne Yvonne Gilbert in 1983. It is organized into sections on the theme of directions, though not strictly compass-related as the title implies.

It won the Locus Award for best Single Author Collection in 1983.

Contents 

 Preface

Nadir
 "'The Author of the Acacia Seeds' and Other Extracts from the Journal of the Association of Therolinguistics" (1974, Fellowship of the Stars)
 "The New Atlantis" (1975, The New Atlantis)
 "Schrödinger's Cat" (1974, Universe 5)

North
 "Two Delays on the Northern Line" (1979, The New Yorker)
 "SQ" (1978, Cassandra Rising)
 "Small Change" (1981, Tor zu den Sternen)

East
 "The First Report of the Shipwrecked Foreigner to the Kadanh of Derb" (1978, Antaeus)
 "The Diary of the Rose" (1976, Future Power)
 "The White Donkey" (1980, TriQuarterly)
 "The Phoenix"

Zenith
 "Intracom" (1974, Stopwatch)
 "The Eye Altering" (1974, The Altered I)
 "Mazes" (1975, Epoch)
 "The Pathways of Desire" (1979, New Dimensions Science Fiction, No. 9)

West
 "Gwilan's Harp" (1977, Redbook)
 "Malheur County" (1979, Kenyon Review)
 "The Water Is Wide" (1976, Pendragon Press (chapbook))

South
 "The Wife's Story"
 "Some Approaches to the Problem of the Shortage of Time" (1979, Omni, as "Where Does the Time Go?")
 "Sur" (1982, The New Yorker)

References

Sources
 
 
 

1982 short story collections
Books illustrated by Anne Yvonne Gilbert
Short story collections by Ursula K. Le Guin
Fantasy short story collections